Old Gerald School is a historic school building located at Gerald, Franklin County, Missouri. It was built in 1910, and is a two-story, rectangular brick building with Georgian Revival style design influences.  It sits on a concrete foundation, has a hipped roof, and measures 66 feet by 36 feet.  A kitchen was added in 1948.  The school closed in 1951.

It was listed on the National Register of Historic Places in 2014.

References

School buildings on the National Register of Historic Places in Missouri
Georgian Revival architecture in Missouri
School buildings completed in 1910
Buildings and structures in Franklin County, Missouri
National Register of Historic Places in Franklin County, Missouri